Star Boating Club is a Wellington based rowing club, situated on the waterfront adjacent to Whairepo Lagoon. It is the oldest rowing club in Wellington, having existed since 1866. Star is one of New Zealand's oldest active rowing clubs and sporting organisations. It is home to rowers of all ages.

Its club building is classified as a "Category I" ("places of 'special or outstanding historical or cultural heritage significance or value'") historic place by Heritage New Zealand.

History
Star Boating Club was conceived in 1866, when a meeting was called to discuss "formation of a Wellington Regatta Club". The club was formalised as the "Star Regatta Club" in 1867, with four boats. The name was changed shortly afterwards to Star Boating Club. In 1881, Star and Union Rowing Club Christchurch first instituted 'club rowing races' as they are known today. By 1903, Star's membership had blossomed to over 400 people.

The club went through darker times during the Great Depression, and 150 and 117 Star members shipped out to serve in World War I and II, respectively. So many members served in WWII that a 'Star Platoon' was attached to the Wellington Regiment's 'B Company'.

Star members at the time included George Cooke (the club's top oarsman in the 1920s and 30s who was killed in action in WWII) and Lord Freyberg (of Freyberg Pool fame, former Governor General and Victoria Cross recipient). Indeed, the 50th anniversary of the club itself was postponed ten years because of the advent of WWII.

The club celebrated its 150-year anniversary in 2016.  It maintains a strong membership of Wellingtonians who still deem it an honour to wear the blue and white colours.

Building 
Star Boating Club has had three club houses. Over the years, the expansion of Wellington City and the development of its shoreline necessitated the Club to move four times. The first two club houses were sheds. The first shed was near the site of the Wellington Cenotaph. In 1874 the club moved to its second shed next to Plimmer's Wharf on Victoria Street. By 1883 the club needed to move again and it was at this point that the current building for the club was built. It was designed by club member and architect William Chatfield. The building was built on sleepers so that as more reclamation took place, it could be moved closer to the shore. It was officially opened on 7 June 1886 and shifted on rails, towed by a steam engine, in 1889.

Renovation and refurbishment  
As part of the redevelopment of Wellington's waterfront in 1989 the building was relocated to its current site. At this time it was also extensively refurbished. Following the 2011 Christchurch earthquake, the clubhouse was earthquake-strengthened.

Downstage Theatre and civic venue 
Between 1969 and 1973 Downstage Theatre occupied the clubrooms while the rowing club continued to operate from the ground floor. The building has been also been used for major events in Wellington, including the 1992 Fringe Festival, the 1993 Gay and Lesbian Devotion Festival, and the International Festival of the Arts in 1994 and 1996.

Notable members 
 Lord Bernard Freyberg
 George Cooke
 John Gibbons
 Louise Trappitt
 Ruby Tew
 George Bridgewater
 Peter Taylor

Membership 
Star Boating Club caters for all levels of rowing from juniors to masters and has produced many successful national and international rowers.

Affiliated schools 
Queen Margaret College
Rongotai College
Scots College
Wellington East Girls' College
Wellington College
Wellington Girls' College
Wellington High School

References

External links

Official site

Rowing clubs in New Zealand
Sport in Wellington City
Buildings and structures in Wellington City
Heritage New Zealand Category 1 historic places in the Wellington Region
1880s architecture in New Zealand
Wellington Harbour